John James Vincent Martorano (born December 13, 1940; also known as "Vincent Joseph Rancourt", "Richard Aucoin", "Nick", "The Cook", "The Executioner", "The Basin Street Butcher") is an American former gangster and former hitman for the Winter Hill Gang in Boston, Massachusetts, who has admitted to 20 mob-related killings.

Early life
John Martorano was born in Somerville, Massachusetts, in 1940. He is the older brother of James "Jimmie" Martorano by eleven months. His father, Angelo "Andy" Martorano was an immigrant from Riesi, Sicily, and with his family he emigrated to the United States around 1915, to East Boston. His mother, Elizabeth Mary "Bess" Hunt, was of Irish descent, who lived in Somerville. Martorano was raised Catholic and served as an altar boy.

The Martorano family moved to the Irish enclave of East Milton. Martorano and his brother attended St Agatha's parochial grammar school in Milton through grade 8, where Martorano was a classmate of future congressman Bill Delahunt's. Martorano attended Mount Saint Charles Academy in Woonsocket, Rhode Island as a freshman while his brother remained in Milton, enrolling in Cunningham Junior High School. Later, in his freshman year, Martorano dropped out of Mount Saint Charles and joined Jimmie at Cunningham. During high school, he and Jimmie were standout football players, and were elected co-captains of the team for their senior season in 1958. Although recruited by several college teams, Martorano did not continue his education beyond his graduation from Milton High.

In a 60 Minutes interview with Steve Kroft, Martorano claimed that when he was young his father told him, "You're the oldest son and this is your heritage" (referring to his father's connections to organized crime). "You've got to take care of your family and be a man."

Criminal career

After graduating from high school, Martorano turned down seven football scholarships and instead stayed in Boston. Hanging out in the Combat Zone, Martorano fell under the guidance of Stephen Flemmi, and by the age of 25 was an active mobster. He committed his first murder at 24, when he allegedly killed Patriarca crime family made man Robert S. Palladino, who was going to testify in a case involving the murder of prostitute Barbara Sylvester in his father's restaurant.

Ralph DeMasi, a Boston mobster incarcerated in White Deer, Pennsylvania, would later write to the courts that when he was driving down Morrissey Boulevard with fellow Irish mobster William (Billy) O'Brien in 1964, Martorano pulled up in a car alongside them and gunned down O'Brien, shooting him seventeen times with a machine gun and wounding DeMasi. In his letter about the events that almost led to his death he wrote, "I thought someone was taking target practice at us. It was my good friend John Martorano."

Martorano rapidly became one of the Winter Hill Gang's most prolific enforcers under the tenures of Howie Winter and Whitey Bulger. In January 1968, after Hubert "Smitty" Smith, an African-American man, helped mobsters Rocco Lammattina and John Cincotti beat up Flemmi in an after-hours saloon, Martorano confronted Smith at the saloon the night after the beating. Despite being ignorant of the circumstances behind Flemmi's beating, Martorano challenged Smith and questioned him about the altercation between Lammattina and Cincotti versus Flemmi. When recounting Smith's responses, Martorano said, "He (Smith) kept giving me the wrong answers. He didn't give me any respect. All he had to say was 'I didn't know he was your friend, I'm sorry.' That's all he needed to say." After Smith failed to answer Martorano's challenge satisfactorily, Martorano tracked Smith to a car on Normandy Street in Dorchester. Smith was accompanied by a 19-year-old woman, Elizabeth Frances "Liz" Dickson, and a 17-year-old boy, Douglas Barrett.  Martorano walked up to the car and killed all three occupants with his .38-caliber snubnosed revolver.

In 1979, Flemmi and Bulger learned that Martorano and several other Winter Hill members, including James "Gentleman Jim" Mulvey, were about to be indicted for a horse race-fixing scheme involving Fat Tony Ciulla. They warned Martorano, who quickly fled to Florida.  He spent the next 16 years as a fugitive, although he was frequently called on to take part in murders. Along with Winter Hill member Joe McDonald, he was the triggerman for the hits on Roger Wheeler and John Callahan.

Arrested in 1995, Martorano was charged, along with Flemmi and two Boston mafiosi, on a massive racketeering indictment; however, he abruptly agreed to a plea bargain deal in 1999. He was angered that Bulger and Flemmi hadn't made any effort to keep him out of the 1979 race-fixing indictment, but had persuaded FBI agent John Connolly to ensure they wouldn't be indicted.  More seriously, Bulger and Flemmi had been the ones to tip off authorities about Martorano's whereabouts. In return for confessing his murders, Martorano received a reduced prison sentence of 12 years. In 2007, he was released from prison and given $20,000 to start a new life.

Murder victims of John Martorano
Alfredo "Indian Al" Angeli 
John Banno
Douglas Barrett
John Callahan
Richard Castucci
Elizabeth Frances "Liz" Dickson
Ronald Hicks
John Jackson
Thomas "Tommy" King
Michael Milano
Joseph J. "Indian Joe" Notarangeli
William L. "Billy" O'Brien
James "Spike" O'Toole
Robert Palladino
Albert Plummer
Herbert "Smitty" Smith
James Sousa
Anthony Veranis
Roger Wheeler

60 Minutes interview

On January 15, 2008, Martorano was interviewed by Steve Kroft on the CBS News television program 60 Minutes. Initially, Martorano had agreed to be interviewed by Ed Bradley, a former Mount Saint Charles Academy classmate, but Bradley died before this could occur. During the interview, Martorano expressed remorse for having killed Elizabeth Dickson, the woman in the car in Dorchester.

Although his friends Whitey Bulger and Stephen Flemmi are considered by many criminologists and investigators to be serial killers, Martorano told Kroft, "I might be a vigilante, but not a serial killer. Serial killers, you have to stop them. They'll never stop, they enjoy it. I never enjoyed it. I don't enjoy risking my life but if the cause was right, I would."

Whitey Bulger trial

In June 2013, Martorano testified as a prosecution witness in Whitey Bulger's trial in Boston, Massachusetts.

Personal life
Martorano was married to Carolyn Wood, an Irish-American, with whom he fathered 5 children, including Vincent, John Jr. and Jeannie Martorano. Carolyn divorced him in 1975, after twelve years of marriage

In popular culture
In the Whitey Bulger biopic Black Mass (2015), Martorano is portrayed by W. Earl Brown.

References

External links

1940 births
Living people
Winter Hill Gang
Mafia hitmen
American assassins
American gangsters of Italian descent
American gangsters of Irish descent
American gangsters
Boston College Eagles football players
American people convicted of murder
People convicted of murder by Massachusetts
People from Milton, Massachusetts
Catholics from Massachusetts
Gangsters from Boston
Mount Saint Charles Academy alumni